Mercury glass (or silvered glass) is glass that was blown double walled, then silvered between the layers with a liquid silvering solution, and sealed. Although mercury was originally used to provide the reflective coating for mirrors, elemental mercury was never used to create tableware. Silvered glass was free-blown, then silvered with a solution containing silver nitrate and grape sugar in solution, heated, then closed. Sealing methods include metal discs covered with a glass round or a cork inserted into the unpolished pontil scar. "Mercury" silvered glass was produced originally around 1840 until at least 1930 in Bohemia (now the Czech Republic), Germany and was  also manufactured in England from 1849 to 1855. 

Edward Varnish and Frederick Hale Thomson patented the technique for silvering glass vessels in 1849. The double walled blanks were furnished by James Powell. The English examples were often cased with a layer of colored glass in jewel tones of ruby red, cobalt blue, amethyst purple and emerald green then cut to silver as illustrated in the photograph. English signatures on silvered glass include E. Varnish & Co. London, Thomson, London and Thomas Lund. 

Blown glass is made utilizing a long metal blowpipe by the glass blower who shapes and heats the object. The piece is attached to a long, flat-topped iron called a pontil to the end of the piece, with a small piece of molten glass, and the blowpipe is now cracked off. The workman completes the object and then, the pontil rod or "punty" is cracked off leaving the familiar rough pontil scar. 

Companies in the United States, including the Boston and Sandwich Glass Company, New England Glass Company, Union Glass Co., and the Boston Silver Glass Company, made silvered glass from about 1852–1880. The New England Glass Company displayed a variety of silvered glass articles including copper wheel engraved goblets, vases and other tableware at the 1853 New Crystal Palace Exhibition. 

Silvered mercury glass from Bohemia was also decorated with a variety of techniques including painting, enameling, etching, and surface engraving. 

Silvered "mercury" glass is considered one of the first true "art glass" types, that is, glass that was made for display and for its inherent artistic value rather than for utilitarian use. 

Authentic antique silvered glass pieces are still available in a wide range of decorative items and usually sold as mercury glass. 

There are many reproductions currently marketed as "mercury glass", in table form, ornaments and other objects. New "mercury glass" can be distinguished from antique silvered glass in several ways, including lack of a double wall, and solid bottoms that are different from true antique silvered glass.

References

 "Mirrored Images: American Silvered Glass 2001—Accessed 2 July 2008
 Diane Lytwyn, "Pictorial Guide to Silvered Mercury Glass", 2007

Glass coating and surface modification